Arturo "Turo" F. Valenzona (born November 5, 1942), is a former Filipino basketball player and head coach.

Valenzona played college ball for the Far Eastern University before eventually playing in the Manila Industrial and Commercial Athletic Association and later in the Philippine Basketball Association with U/Tex.

Coaching career
After his playing years, Valenzona coached the FEU Tamaraws to several championships in the UAAP and the Intercollegiate tournament. He gave Solidmills one interclub and one MICAA title, and led APCOR to six straight championships. He was also coach of the RP Youth team in 1978 and 1980. He assisted coach Nic Jorge during the 1978 Bangkok Asian Games.  Valenzona was a low-key coach who made very smart decisions on the bench, particularly in clutch situations.

In the PBA, Valenzona became head coach of Gilbey's Gin at the start of the 1982 season, replacing Nemie Villegas, he led Gilbey's to three runner-up finishes from 1982-1984. The following year, the La Tondeña ballclub decided to replace him but he was soon back at the bench when Tanduay offered him a coaching job later that year, replacing Orly Castelo. In 1986, Valenzona had a memorable year, leading Tanduay Rhum Makers to their first PBA title and two straight championships. He added another title when the Rhum Makers went home with the Open Conference title in 1987.

He moved to the Hills Bros bench in the third conference of the 1987 PBA season and led the Coffee Kings to a runner-up finish. Aside from the PBA, he simultaneously coached a commercial ballclubs in the PABL, first with Golden Rice Cereals in late 1984, and later on with Hope Cigarettes, RFM-Swift's and the comebacking Crispa 400 in 1989.

Valenzona led the collegiate team San Sebastian College to four consecutive men's basketball championships in the NCAA from 1993-1996. He was the first president of the Basketball Coaches Association of the Philippines in the 1990s.

Political career 
Valenzona ran for councilor of Manila from the fifth district in 2016.

Collegiate record

References

Living people
1942 births
Filipino men's basketball coaches
Tanduay Rhum Masters coaches
FEU Tamaraws basketball players
Basketball players from Manila
Philippines men's national basketball team players
Filipino men's basketball players
Filipino sportsperson-politicians
Politicians from Manila
FEU Tamaraws basketball coaches
Barangay Ginebra San Miguel coaches
Alaska Aces (PBA) coaches
Pop Cola Panthers coaches
San Sebastian Stags basketball coaches